Kim Min-jae (Korean: 김민재; born 13 October 1983) is a South Korean weightlifter. He competed for South Korea  at the 2012 Summer Olympics. Kim originally finished eighth in the 2012 London Olympics, but retesting of samples of athletes from the 2012 Olympics discovered that six of the top seven athletes were disqualified when found to be positive for the presence of performance-enhancing drugs. Therefore Kim became the silver medallist in the 94 kg weightlifting category.

References

South Korean male weightlifters
Weightlifters at the 2012 Summer Olympics
Olympic weightlifters of South Korea
1983 births
Living people
Asian Games medalists in weightlifting
Weightlifters at the 2010 Asian Games
Weightlifters at the 2014 Asian Games
Asian Games silver medalists for South Korea
Asian Games bronze medalists for South Korea
Olympic silver medalists for South Korea
Olympic medalists in weightlifting
Medalists at the 2010 Asian Games
Medalists at the 2014 Asian Games
Medalists at the 2012 Summer Olympics
World Weightlifting Championships medalists
20th-century South Korean people
21st-century South Korean people